Bordoni is an Italian surname. Notable people with the surname include:

Antonio Bordoni (1789–1860), Italian mathematician
Carlo Bordoni (born 1946), Italian sociologist and writer
Faustina Bordoni (1697–1781), Italian mezzo-soprano
Francesco Bordoni (1580–1654), Italian sculptor
Franco Bordoni-Bisleri (1913–1975), Italian fighter pilot of WW II
Frank Bordoni, British celebrity chef
Irène Bordoni (1885–1953), French singer, Broadway and film actress
Paolo Bordoni, Italian pianist
Piero Giorgio Bordoni (1915–2009), Italian physicist
Simona Bordoni, American climate scientist
Walter Bordoni (born 1962), Uruguayan composer, singer, pianist and guitarist

See also
Fondazione Ugo Bordoni, a research foundation started in 1952
Villa bordoni, an Italian villa outside of Greve in Chianti in Tuscany
Bordone (disambiguation)

Italian-language surnames